Myjava District is a district in the Trenčín Region of western Slovakia. It is located in the area of the Myjava Hills. Myjava district belongs to the smaller districts in Slovakia and the population density is slightly under the country average. In the north it borders with the Czech Republic. Myjava district was established in 1923 and in its present borders exists from 1996.

Municipalities

References

External links 
Official site

Districts of Slovakia
Trenčín Region